Yi Gi (hanja:; October 26, 1476 – April 28, 1552) was a Korean scholar-official during the Joseon period. He was Chief State Councillor from 1549 to 1551. He was the nephew of Seong Dam su (성담수), one of the members of Saengyuksin (생육신), and a relative of Yi Yi (Yulgok; 율곡 이이).

Family 
 Father - Yi Ui-mu (이의무, 李宜茂)
 Grandfather - Yi Chu (이추, 李抽)
 Mother - Lady Seong of the Changnyeong Seong clan (창녕 성씨)
 Grandmother - Seong Hui (성희, 成熺)
 Siblings
 Older sister - Lady of the Deoksu Yi clan (이씨)
 Brother-in-law - Jo Gye-sang (조계상, 曺繼商)
 Older brother - Yi Wi (이위, 李葦); died prematurely 
 Older brother - Yi Kwon (이권, 李菤)
 Sister-in-law - Lady Choi; daughter of Choi Yeon-ui (최연의)
 Younger brother - Yi Haeng (이행, 李荇)
 Sister-in-law - Lady Yi of the Jeonju Yi clan (전주 이씨); daughter of Yi Jo (이조, 李稠)
 Younger brother - Yi Yeong (이영, 李苓)
 Sister-in-law - Lady Yi of the Gyeongju Yi clan (경주 이씨); daughter of Yi Su-paeng (이수팽, 李壽彭)
 Younger brother - Yi Bong (이봉, 李芃)
 Sister-in-law - Lady Yi of the Haman Yi clan (함안 이씨); daughter of Yi Je (이제, 李霽)
 Wife and issue
 Lady Kim (김씨); daughter of Kim Jin (김진, 金震)
 Daughter - Lady of the Deoksu Yi clan (이씨)
 Son-in-law - Ahn Eung-won (안응원, 安應元)
 Son - Yi Won-woo (이원우, 李元祐)
 Grandson - Yi Pil (이필, 李泌) 
 Granddaughter-in-law - Gu Geum-ok (구금옥, 具金玉), Lady Gu of the Neungseong Gu clan (능성 구씨, 綾城 具氏)
 Adoptive Great-Grandson - Yi Ahn-nul (이안눌, 李安訥)

See also 
 Yi I
 Yi Sun-sin
 Yun Won-hyung

References

External links
 Yi Gi:Nate
 Yi Gi:Naver
 Yi Gi

1476 births
1552 deaths
16th-century Korean poets